Botevo is a village in Valchedram Municipality, Northwestern Bulgaria.

Villages in Montana Province